Malachite is a copper carbonate hydroxide mineral, with the formula Cu2CO3(OH)2. This opaque, green-banded mineral crystallizes in the monoclinic crystal system, and most often forms botryoidal, fibrous, or stalagmitic masses, in fractures and deep, underground spaces, where the water table and hydrothermal fluids provide the means for chemical precipitation. Individual crystals are rare, but occur as slender to acicular prisms. Pseudomorphs after more tabular or blocky azurite crystals also occur.

Etymology and history

The mineral was given this name due to its resemblance to the leaves of the mallow plant. Copper (Cu2+) gives malachite its green color.

Malachite was mined from deposits near the Isthmus of Suez and the Sinai as early as 4000 BCE.

It was extensively mined at the Great Orme Mines in Britain 3,800 years ago, using stone and bone tools. Archaeological evidence indicates that mining activity ended , with up to 1,760 tonnes of copper being produced from the mined malachite.

Archaeological evidence indicates that the mineral has been mined and smelted to obtain copper at Timna Valley in Israel for more than 3,000 years. Since then, malachite has been used as both an ornamental stone and as a gemstone.

The use of azurite and malachite as copper ore indicators led indirectly to the name of the element nickel in the English language. Nickeline, a principal ore of nickel that is also known as niccolite, weathers at the surface into a green mineral (annabergite) that resembles malachite. This resemblance resulted in occasional attempts to smelt nickeline in the belief that it was copper ore, but such attempts always ended in failure due to high smelting temperatures needed to reduce nickel. In Germany this deceptive mineral came to be known as kupfernickel, literally "copper demon." The Swedish alchemist Baron Axel Fredrik Cronstedt (who had been trained by Georg Brandt, the discoverer of the nickel-like metal cobalt) realized that there was probably a new metal hiding within the kupfernickel ore, and in 1751 he succeeded in smelting kupfernickel to produce a previously unknown (except in certain meteorites) silvery white, iron-like metal. Logically, Cronstedt named his new metal after the nickel part of kupfernickel.

Occurrence

Malachite often results from the supergene weathering and oxidation of primary sulfidic copper ores, and is often found with azurite (Cu3(CO3)2(OH)2), goethite, and calcite. Except for its vibrant green color, the properties of malachite are similar to those of azurite and aggregates of the two minerals occur frequently. Malachite is more common than azurite and is typically associated with copper deposits around limestones, the source of the carbonate.

Large quantities of malachite have been mined in the Urals, Russia. Ural malachite is not being mined at present, but G.N Vertushkova reports the possible discovery of new deposits of malachite in the Urals. It is found worldwide including in the Democratic Republic of the Congo; Gabon; Zambia; Tsumeb, Namibia; Mexico; Broken Hill, New South Wales; Burra, South Australia; Lyon, France; Timna Valley, Israel; and the Southwestern United States, most notably in Arizona.

Structure
Malachite crystallizes in the monoclinic system. The structure consists of chains of alternating Cu2+ ions and OH− ions, with a net positive charge, woven between isolated triangular CO32− ions. Thus each copper ion is conjugated to two hydroxyl ions and two carbonate ions; each hydroxyl ion is conjugated with two copper ions; and each carbonate ion is conjugated with six copper ions.

Use

Malachite was used as a mineral pigment in green paints from antiquity until  1800. The pigment is moderately lightfast, sensitive to acids, and varying in color. This natural form of green pigment has been replaced by its synthetic form, verditer, among other synthetic greens.

Malachite is also used for decorative purposes, such as in the Malachite Room in the Hermitage Museum, which features a huge malachite vase, and the Malachite Room in Castillo de Chapultepec in Mexico City. Another example is the Demidov Vase, part of the former Demidov family collection, and now in the Metropolitan Museum of Art. "The Tazza", a large malachite vase, one of the largest pieces of malachite in North America and a gift from Tsar Nicholas II, stands as the focal point in the centre of the room of Linda Hall Library. In the time of Tsar Nicolas I decorative pieces with malachite were among the most popular diplomatic gifts.  It was used in China as far back as the Eastern Zhou period. The base of FIFA World Cup Trophy has two layers of malachite.

Symbolism and superstitions
A 17th-century Spanish superstition held that having a child wear a lozenge of malachite would help them sleep, and keep evil spirits at bay. Marbodus recommended malachite as a talisman for young people because of its protective qualities and its ability to help with sleep. It has also historically been worn for protection from lightning and contagious diseases and for health, success, and constancy in the affections. During the Middle Ages it was customary to wear it engraved with a figure or symbol of the Sun to maintain health and to avert depression to which Capricorns were considered vulnerable.

In ancient Egypt the colour green (wadj) was associated with death and the power of resurrection as well as new life and fertility. Ancient Egyptians believed that the afterlife contained an eternal paradise, referred to as the "Field of Malachite", which resembled their lives but with no pain or suffering.

Ore uses 

Simple methods of copper ore extraction from malachite involved thermodynamic processes such as smelting. This reaction involves the addition of heat and a carbon, causing the carbonate to decompose leaving copper oxide and an additional carbon source such as coal converts the copper oxide into copper metal.

The basic word equation for this reaction is:

Copper carbonate + heat → carbon dioxide + copper oxide (color changes from green to black).

Copper oxide + carbon → carbon dioxide + copper (color change from black to copper colored).

Malachite is a low grade copper ore, however, due to increase demand for metals, more economic processing such as hydrometallurgical methods (using aqueous solutions such as sulfuric acid) are being used as malachite is readily soluble in dilute acids. Sulfuric acid is the most common leaching agent for copper oxide ores like malachite and eliminates the need for smelting processes.

The chemical equation for sulfuric acid leaching of copper ore from malachite is as follows:

Health and environmental concerns 
Mining for malachite for ornamental or copper ore purposes involves open-pit mining or underground mining depending on the grade of the ore deposits.  Open-pit and underground mining practices can cause environmental degradation through habitat and biodiversity loss.  Acid mine drainage can contaminate water and food sources to negatively impact human health if improperly managed or if leaks from tailing ponds occur.  The risk of health and environmental impacts of both traditional metallurgy and newer methods of hydrometallurgy are both significant, however, water conservation and waste management practices for hydrometallurgy processes for ore extraction, such as for malachite, are stricter and relatively more sustainable.  New research is also being conducted on better alternatives to methods such as sulfuric acid leaching which has high environmental impacts, even under hydrometallurgy regulation standards and innovation.

Gallery

See also
 Aventurine
 Brochantite
 Chrysocolla
 Dioptase
 Green pigments
 List of inorganic pigments
 Plancheite
 Pseudomalachite
 Turquoise
 Verdigris

References

External links

 Virtual tour of the Malachite Room
 Malachite, Colourlex
 Malachite in art and malachite diplomacy

Carbonate minerals
Copper ores
Gemstones
Inorganic pigments
Minerals in space group 14
Monoclinic minerals